Mohammad Ghazi (also romanized as Muhammad Qazi) (August 3, 1913 in Mahabad, Iran – January 14, 1998 in Tehran) was a prolific, renowned Iranian translator and writer of Kurdish origin who translated numerous books mainly from French into Persian. He wrote/ translated nearly 70 books.

Ghazi studied literature at Darolfonoun, Tehran.

In 1953, Ghazi published the Persian translation of Penguin Island. The following year, he translated The Little Prince.  Having translated Don Quixote of Cervantes, he received an award for best translation of the year from Tehran University. He has translated more than 60 books including Madame Bovary, The Last Day of a Condemned Man, Captain Michalis, Christ Recrucified, Zorba the Greek and The Decameron. Bread and Wine

He died on January 14, 1998, in Day Hospital, Tehran, at the age of 85.

References

Iranian translators
Iranian Kurdish people
1913 births
1998 deaths
People from Mahabad
Kurdish scholars
Kurdish writers
Kurdish poets
Tudeh Party of Iran members
20th-century translators